Frederik Bilovský (born 3 March 1992) is a Slovak football midfielder who currently plays for FC Nitra.

Club career
He made his debut for Spartak Myjava on 29 March 2014 against Nitra, entering in as a substitute in place of Tomáš Bruško in the 69th minute of the game. After Myjava withdrew from Fortuna Liga during the winter break in 2016–17 season, Bilovský joined Czech top-division club Dukla Prague, where he had spent some 2 years. After this spell, he returned to Slovakia, signing for Nitra on 23 January 2019, being understood as partial replacement for Andrej Fábry, who left Nitra for Czech top-division club Jablonec.

References

External links
Spartak Myjava profile 
Eurofotbal profile

MFK Dubnica profile 

1992 births
Living people
Slovak footballers
Slovak expatriate footballers
Association football midfielders
People from Dubnica nad Váhom
Sportspeople from the Trenčín Region
FK Dubnica players
Spartak Myjava players
FK Dukla Prague players
FC Nitra players
Slovak Super Liga players
Czech First League players
Expatriate footballers in the Czech Republic
Slovak expatriate sportspeople in the Czech Republic